The Macchi M.12 was a biplane flying boat bomber designed by Alessandro Tonini, and produced in small numbers by Macchi in Italy in 1918.

Design and development
The M.12 had a conventional design, generally similar to an enlarged version of other Macchi designs of the period, and featured the Warren truss-style interplane struts that had been introduced on the Macchi M.9. A major difference however, was its twin-boom fuselage, each with a separate tailfin. An M.12 was entered in the Schneider Trophy race of 1920, but did not compete.

The M.12bis was a civil variant with five seats and a wingspan extended to 18 m (59 ft), intended to carry passengers and mail.

Specifications

See also

Notes

References

 
 

1910s Italian bomber aircraft
Flying boats
M.12
Single-engined pusher aircraft
Biplanes
Twin-boom aircraft
Aircraft first flown in 1918